Stockholm Berserkers is a Swedish gay rugby club in Stockholm. They currently play in Mälardalsserien, the second level of rugby in Sweden and are members of the International Gay Rugby Association and Board.

History
The club was founded in 2011.

References

External links
 

Swedish rugby union teams
Sport in Stockholm
Rugby clubs established in 2011